Club Unión Española S.A.D.P. is a professional football club based in the Independencia neighborhood, commune of Santiago, Chile. They currently participate in the Primera División de Chile. It has a branch of women's football, and competes in national tournaments with its lower categories. Acclaimed as one of the four great of Chilean football, it is one of the longest-lived teams in the country.

Unión Española has won Primera División seven times, behind Colo-Colo (31), Universidad de Chile (18), Universidad Católica (14) and Cobreloa (8), as well as winning two Copa Chile titles. On the South American stage Unión has participated nine times in Copa Libertadores, one time in Copa Sudamericana and one time in the Copa Ganadores de Copa. Unión also was runner-up in the Copa Libertadores of 1975.

In July 2008, the club was purchased by the Spanish entrepreneur and owner of SEK University, Jorge Segovia. Segovia purchased all rights federative, the lower divisions, the pass of the players and the logo of the club, for a fee of 2.5 billion Chilean pesos (US$1.25 million).

Home games have been played at the Estadio Santa Laura since their 1922 opening. After Segovia's arrival in May 2008, the stadium was remodeled at a cost of 4 billion pesos. In 2009, the stadium was renamed as Estadio Santa Laura–Universidad SEK.

The club's traditional rivals are Palestino, a team founded by members of the Palestinian diaspora living in Chile and Audax Italiano, which originated from their local Italian counterpart. With Palestino and Audax, the team plays the so-called Clásico de Colonias ("Diaspora Derby"). Unión Española is also the second oldest club of the Primera División Chilena behind Santiago Wanderers that was founded in 1892.

History

Foundation, Amateur Era and First seasons

The team was founded as Centro Español de Instrucción y Recreación on 18 May 1897 by a group of Spanish immigrants resident in Chile. In 1918 two other teams were founded: Club Ciclista Ibérico and the Club Ibérico Balompié. Both clubs merged in 1922, becoming the club, Unión Deportiva Española. The club operated as titular team in the Estadio Santa Laura.

In the first seasons of the club, Unión Deportiva Española participated in the championship of the Asociación de Fútbol de Santiago. In this tournament the club won his first two consecutive titles in the Copa Chile, in the seasons of 1924 and 1925. The team was led by his captain, the Spanish defender Juan Legarreta.

In 1927, following the merger of the National Football Federation occurred the year before, the championship was called Liga Central de Football. Because of the participation of too many clubs, league was divided into two categories in 1927 and 1928: the Serie A and Serie B. The club also was in the Serie A. In 1928, Unión Deportiva Española was awarded its second title, after winning the Liga Central de Fútbol.

In May 1933, Unión Deportiva Española with Colo-Colo, Santiago Badminton, Audax Italiano, Green Cross, Magallanes and Santiago National, were the clubs that founded the Professional League of Chile, part of the Asociación de Fútbol de Santiago. In the Apertura Championship of the same year, Unión achieved the runner-up, after lossing the final against Colo-Colo, in a 2–1 loss. In the Official Championship, the club finished in the fourth place of eight teams.

In the next year, with the final fusion of Centro Español de Instrucción y Recreación and Unión Deportiva Española, in 1934, the club take definitely the name of Unión Española (being re–founded symbolically on 9 December 1935).

In 1939, Unión only played one match in the Primera División 1939 (against Colo-Colo), under the name of Central, in the first week of the tournament. Because the Spanish Civil War of this year, the club's leadership entered in recess for one year. In the next season, Unión had a youth squad during the Primera División tournament of 1940, but the team finished in the tenth place. In 1943, Unión won his first professional title in the Primera División.

After the runner-up achieved in 1945, 1948, in 1950, the team once was runner-up, after lossing the Championship play-offs against Everton for 1–0, with a goal of René Meléndez. Unión once win the Primera División title in 1951 under the Spanish coach Isidro Lángara. This title was the second in Unión Española's history.

Golden Age

Under the Argentine Nestor Isella as coach, Unión Española was the runner-up of the Primera División Chilena in 1970, after a loss in the final match against Colo-Colo in January 1971. However, being the runner-up allowed to Unión to participate for the first time in the Copa Libertadores. In the Copa Libertadores 1971, the club finished first in the group stage, qualifying for the semi-finals, but Unión was eliminated in the group in the last position. Whilst in the local tournament, Unión finished in the third place. In the next season, the club once again was runner-up against Colo-Colo and qualified to Copa Libertadores.

In the season of 1973, with the arrival of the coach Luis Santibáñez to the club, Unión was proclaimed champion of Primera División for the second time, and the team had also the highest goalscorer of the tournament, Guillermo Yávar. In the international tournaments, Unión had a poor performance during the Copa Libertadores 1973, finishing in the last position of the group stage.

On the next season, the coach Luis Santibáñez went to Deportes Ovalle, but he returned to the club in June 1974. In the tournaments Unión had a regular season, finished in the fourth place of the Primera División of 1974 and finishing in the last position of the group stage of Copa Libertadores. However, Unión won the Copa Libertadores play-offs and qualified to the Copa Libertadores of the next year.

One of the most successful seasons of Union Española's history was the 1975 season, winning the national tournament and the runner-up achieved in the Copa Libertadores against Independiente of Avellaneda. In the season of 1976, the squad of Unión Española was totally dismantled, because of offers for their players by other clubs. On the Primera División tournament, Unión finished in the first place with Everton, and both clubs had to play a Championship play-off, that Unión lost. In the Libertadores play-offs, Unión did not qualify to the tournament, after a finish in the third position. However, in 1977, Unión was champion of the tournament.

Irregular years
The years 1980s were irregular season for the Hispanic club. In 1983, Unión made a poor season finishing in the 20th place of 22 teams, meaning the relegation to the Second Division. Finally, the club not relegated because a decree of the directive of the Asociación Central de Fútbol (AFC). In the next season, Unión integrated the South Group, qualifying with Universidad Católica. In the Championship play-off, Unión played a quadrangular, finishing in the third place behind Cobresal.

After an irregular season in 1987, one of maximum idols of the club Honorino Landa died. Because his dead, was performed a cup in his honor, called "Copa Honorino Landa". The cup was played against Universidad Católica, and the club was defeated by Católica for 3–0. In the same year, the club finished in the twelfth place of 16 teams. In 1988, Unión achieved the runner-up of the Copa Chile, after lossing against Colo-Colo.

In 1989, the club disputed the Winter Cup, tournament designed by the ANFP, for keep active the club during the development of the Copa América 1989. In the contest, The Hispanics integrated the Group 3. Unión qualified to the quarter-finals. After winning the quarter-finals and the semi-finals, the club finally disputed the final against Huachipato, however, Unión won the game by 2–0, crowning champion of the contest.

In 1992, arrived Nelson Acosta to the bench, former coach of O'Higgins. In the first season of Acosta in Unión, he proclaimed to Unión champion of the Copa Chile 1992, with Marcelo Vega as top-scorer of the team and the contest with 13 goals. However, the club was crowned for second consecutive time of the tournament in 1993, beating to Cobreloa by 3–1 at Estadio Nacional.

In 1997, Unión Española completed a century of history. In this season, Unión was relegated for first time in its history to the Second Division, now called Primera B and the coach Acosta leave the club, because the relegation. For the season 1999, the directive hired to the coach Juvenal Olmos.

2000s

Unión Española returned to the Primera División in 2000 with a then-record 70 points. In the Primera División, Unión finished in the fourth place. Because the departure of Juvenal Olmos to Universidad Católica, the former player Leonardo Véliz arrived as coach in 2001.

The team was under the coach, Fernando Carvallo during two seasons (2003–04). In the second season of Carvallo in Unión, the club was eliminated in the quarter-finals of the play-offs by Santiago Wanderers, during the Torneo de Apertura, and in the Torneo de Clausura of the same year, Unión was runner-up of the tournament, after lossing the final against Cobreloa.

Because the departure of the coach Fernando Carvallo to Palestino, he was replaced by Fernando Díaz Seguel, with Díaz Seguel as the coach, Unión Española was champion of the Torneo Apertura 2005, winning the sixth title in Primera División in its history.

Because the title obtained in the Apertura 2005, Unión played the Copa Libertadores 2006. In this international tournament, Unión failed to qualify to the second stage. The club was ubicated in the third position with 8 points alongside Argentine club Newell's Old Boys, but Newells had more goal difference making that Unión was eliminated of the tournament. However, in the national tournament, Unión made a poor season, finishing in the thirteenth place of the Annual Table.

In the next season, Unión Española made a regular season on Torneo de Apertura 2007, finishing in the eight place. But on the Torneo de Clausura, the team worse totally his performance finishing in the eighteenth place of the Clausura and nearly going to the promotion play–offs after finishing sixteenth place in the Annual Table.

In 2008, under the Argentine Marcelo Espina as coach, Unión won his first three games of Torneo de Apertura 2008 against Deportes Melipilla, Audax Italiano and Universidad Católica, but on the next weeks the team worse his performance. On July of the same year, the club was purchased by the Spanish employer Jorge Segovia for a fee of 2.500 million pesos. The first changes after arrival of Segovia to the club, was the hiring of Jorge Garcés as coach, because the departure of Espina. However, Jorge Garcés had a worse performance of Espina, and he was dismissed. The coach Luis Hernán Carvallo arrived in his replace. Shortly after, the club went to the Promotion playoffs against Deportes Puerto Montt, and the club nearly relegated to Primera B, after an aggregate result of 5–4.

In the next season, the club made a notable season in the Torneo de Apertura 2009, finishing in the first season at regular phase, qualifying to the play-offs and the Copa Sudamericana 2009, but in the play-offs the team was runner–up of the tournament against Universidad de Chile, on a 2–1 aggregate result. Because the first place obtained in the Apertura, Unión qualified to the Copa Sudamericana 2009, the club defeat to La Equidad on 3–2 aggregate, qualifying to the Round of 16 against Vélez Sársfield, but the team nearly qualified to the quarter-finals, after a loss of 5–4 on the aggregate.

2010s
In the Primera División Chilena 2010, Unión finished in the fifth place with 52 points over Huachipato with 48 points in the sixth place, qualifying to the Libertadores play-offs. In this play-offs, Unión won the tournament against Audax Italiano in the final, and the team qualficated to the 2011 Copa Libertadores First Stage against Bolívar. In the first stage of the tournament, Unión won 1–0 on aggregate, qualifying to the second stage. In the group stage, Unión finished in the last place with 4 points under Caracas in the third position with 7 points.

Unión won the Apertura Tournament of 2013, after defeating Colo-Colo 1–0 on the final match. Although they tied with Universidad Católica, they won the tournament by goal difference.

Club Facts
85 Seasons in Primera División: (1933–1938, 1940–1997, 2000–)
2 Seasons in Primera B: (1998–1999)
12 Participations in Copa Libertadores (1971, 1973, 1974, 1975, 1976, 1978, 1994, 2006, 2011, 2012, 2014, 2017)
3 Participations in Copa Sudamericana (2009, 2018, 2019)
1 Participation in Copa Ganadores de Copa (1970)
Record Primera División victory — 14–1 v. Morning Star (1934)
Record Primera División defeat — 0–6 v. Santiago Morning (1954)
Record Copa Chile victory — 7–0 v. Municipal La Pintana (2011)
Most goals scored (Primera División matches) — 132, Honorino Landa (1960–1965, 1969, 1973)
Highest home attendance  — 76,118 v. Colo-Colo (7 January 1990) (at Estadio Nacional)
Primera División Best Position  — Champions (1943, 1951, 1973, 1975, 1977, 2005-A, 2013-T)
Copa Chile Best Season  — Champions (1992, 1993)

Players

Current squad

The teams of the Chilean Primera Division are limited to seven players without Chilean nationality and also are limited to five foreign players in the field. The squads with more of seven players in the squad or five foreign players are sanctioned by the ANFP. The squad of the club now have all places of foreign players, two Argentine players, one Palestinian, and one Uruguayan player.

2023 Summer Transfers

In

Out

Former players

  Marcelo Salinas

Managers

Current staff

Historical Managers

 Juan Legarreta (1922–30)
 Luis Tirado (1932–35)
 Manuel Casals (1940–43)
 Atanasio Pardo (1943)
 Isidro Lángara (1950–51)
 Hernán Fernández (1954)
 Francisco Hormazábal (1959–60)
  Francisco Molina (1966–67)
 Andrés Prieto (1968)
 Sergio Navarro (1969)
 Pedro Areso (1969)
 Miguel Mocciola (1969)
 Francisco Vairo (1970)
 Pedro Areso (1970)
  Néstor Isella (1971–72)
 Luis Santibáñez (1973)
 Jaime Ramírez (1974)
 Manuel Rodríguez (1974)
 Luis Santibáñez (1975–77)
 Pedro García (1978)
 Luis Álamos (1978)
 Germán Cornejo (1978–79)
 José María Silvero (1979)
 Orlando Aravena (1980)
  Nicolás Novello (1981–82)
 Honorino Landa (1982–83)
 Humberto Cruz (1983)
 Orlando Aravena (1984–85)
 Héctor Pinto (1986–88)
 Luis Santibáñez (1988)
 Manuel Rodríguez (1989–91)
  Nelson Acosta (1992)
 Guillermo Yávar (1992)
 Pedro García (1992)
  Nelson Acosta (1993–96)
 Julio Comesaña (1996)
  Jorge Spedaletti (1996)
 Guillermo Páez (1996–97)
 Luis Ahumada (1997)
 Rogelio Delgado (1997)
 Guillermo Yávar (1998)
 Juvenal Olmos (1999–01)
 Leonardo Véliz (2001–02)
 Roberto Hernández (2002–03)
 Fernando Carvallo (2003–04)
 Fernando Díaz (2005)
 Fernando Carvallo (1 Jan 2006 – 30 June 2006)
 Manuel Rodríguez (2006)
 Héctor Pinto (2007)
 Marcelo Espina (2007–08)
 Jorge Garcés (2008)
 Luis Hernán Carvallo (2008–09)
 José Luis Sierra (2009)
 Rubén Israel (15 Oct 2009 – 12 Oct 2010)
 José Luis Sierra (14 Oct 2010–15)
 Fernando Vergara (2015–16)
 Vladimir Bigorra (2016)
 Martín Palermo (2016–2018)
 Fernando Díaz (2018–2019)
 Ronald Fuentes (2019–2021)
 Jorge Pellicer (2021–)

Honours

League
 Primera División de Chile (first tier)
 Winners (7): 1943, 1951, 1973, 1975, 1977, 2005–A, 2013–T
 Runners-up (10): 1945, 1948, 1950, 1970, 1972, 1976, 2004–C, 2009–A, 2012–C, 2017–T
 Primera B (second tier)
 Winners (1): 1999

Cup
 Copa Chile
 Winners (2): 1992, 1993
 Runners-up (2): 1977, 1988
 Copa Invierno
 Winners (1): 1989
 Campeonato de Apertura
 Winners (1): 1947
 Supercopa de Chile
 Winners (1): 2013

Continental
 Copa Libertadores
 Runner-up (1): 1975

References

External links
Official website
 

News sites
Unión Española news at Goal
Unión Española news at Anfp.cl
ESPN profile

 
Football clubs in Chile
Diaspora sports clubs
Association football clubs established in 1897
Sport in Santiago
1897 establishments in Chile